Symbiosis Institute of Business Management, Pune or SIBM Pune is constituent of Symbiosis International University. Established in 1978, the institute offers master's degree programmes in management, innovation and entrepreneurship and a number of executive training programmes. SIBM Pune Admission is granted on the basis of candidates’ performance in SNAP.

History 
SIBM Pune was established in 1978 by Dr. S B Mujumdar. Established under the patronage of S. B. Mujumdar, president and founding director, the Symbiosis Society is registered under the Societies Registration Act, 1860 and the Bombay Public Trust, Act, 1950. The first institutions belonging to the Symbiosis Society were established in 1971 and were affiliated with the University of Pune. Since mid 2014 Dr Ramakrishnan Raman is the Director of SIBM Pune.

Campus

Originally located as part of the combined campus of Symbiosis institutes in Pune city, the institute shifted to a new residential campus at Lavale in Mulshi Taluka at the outskirts of Pune city in 2008.

Institute Rankings

Notable alumni 

Neeraj Ghyawan (Film Director)
Babu Antony (Actor)
Radhika Maira Tabrez (Indian Writer)
Divya Prakash Dubey (Hindi Writer)

References

External links
 Official Website

Educational institutions established in 1978
1978 establishments in Maharashtra
Business schools in Maharashtra
Universities and colleges in Pune